Kaikalas are a Telugu, Tamil-speaking weaving caste. Kaikalas live in the Coastal Andhra and Rayalaseema regions of the South Indian state of Andhra Pradesh.They are classified as Other Backward Class (OBC) by the Government of India. They are also known as Karikala Bhaktulu, Kaikala, Kaikkolar, Sengundar.

The community is divided into sects based on Sampradaya as Shaivas and Vaishnavas. While the Shaivas give preference to worshipping Shiva, the Vaishnavas give preference to worshipping Vishnu.

The Kaikalas form a very important part of the Thathayagunta Gangamma Jatara, the annual folk festival held at Tirupati.

See also
Sengunthar
Devanga
Padmasali

References

Indian castes
Social groups of Andhra Pradesh
Telugu society
Weaving communities of South Asia